Wilfrid Hamel (16 July 1895 – 31 December 1968) was a Canadian politician, serving as a member of the Legislative Assembly of Quebec and as Mayor of Quebec City.

His early career began in 1913 at the company Maranda et Labrecque, becoming a director there from 1925 to 1941. From 1940 to 1942, he was a church warden for the Sacré-Coeur-de-Jésus Roman Catholic congregation.

In 1939, he was elected as a Liberal provincial member of Quebec's assembly in Saint-Sauveur riding and served in the cabinet of Premier Adélard Godbout as Minister of State and Minister of Land and Forests. Hamel was re-elected at Saint-Sauveur in 1944, but was defeated in the 1948 and 1952 elections.

Hamel was Mayor of Quebec City for twelve years, beginning in December 1953.

External links

 
  City of Quebec: Wilfrid Hamel

1895 births
1968 deaths
Mayors of Quebec City
Quebec Liberal Party MNAs